Carroll Kendrick (May 24, 1852 - February 17, 1923) was a Mississippi state legislator in the late 19th and early 20th centuries. He was the President Pro Tempore of the Mississippi State Senate from 1916 to 1920.

Biography 
Carroll Kendrick was born on May 24, 1852, near Hamburg, in Hardin County, Tennessee. He was the son of Allen Kendrick and Nancy (Rose) Kendrick. He graduated from the Iuka Normal Institute with an A. B., and from Hiram College with a M. A. degree. In 1873, he graduated from the University of Louisville with an M. D. degree. During Reconstruction, he was a member of the Ku Klux Klan.

Political career 
From 1884 to 1888, he served in the Mississippi House of Representatives, representing Tishomingo County as a Democrat. He was then in the Mississippi State Senate, representing the state's 37th district, which was composed of the state's Tishomingo, Alcorn, and Prentiss counties, from 1890 to 1900. He was re-elected in 1903, for the 1904–1908 term, and in 1911, for the 1912–1916 term. In 1907, he was the president of Mississippi's state Medical Association. Kendrick was re-elected to the Senate for the 1916–1920 term, in which he also served the position of president pro tempore. Kendrick died on February 17, 1923.

References 

1852 births
1923 deaths
People from Hardin County, Tennessee
People from Tishomingo County, Mississippi
Democratic Party members of the Mississippi House of Representatives
Democratic Party Mississippi state senators
American Ku Klux Klan members
Place of death missing
19th-century American politicians
20th-century American politicians
Presidents pro tempore of the Mississippi State Senate